The Pokuttia–Bukovina dialect is a dialect of the Ukrainian language that originated in Pokuttia and Bukovina under the influence of the Romanian language. Along with Hutsul, Upper Prutian and Upper Sannian dialects, it is part of the archaic Galician-Bukovinian group of dialects. The dialect is locally spoken in some regions in Western Ukraine south of the Dniester and east of the Carpathian Mountains (on the territory of the Chernivtsi Oblast excluding its extremely western regions, and in the eastern part of Ivano-Frankivsk Oblast).

History 

The territory of Pokuttia had been part of Moldavia since the 14th century. The Moldavian state had appeared by the mid-14th century, eventually expanding its territory all the way to the Black Sea. Bukovina and neighboring regions were the nucleus of the Moldavian Principality, with the city of Iași (outside but near Bukovina) as its capital from 1388 (after Baia and Siret, both in Bukovina). When Moldavia established its control over part of Pokuttia and Bukovina, there occurred a process of Romanianization. The language of the Moldavians influenced the language spoken by locals, and the Pokuttia–Bukovina dialect was formed. It is distinct from other Ukrainian dialects because all of them are influenced by other Slavic languages, while the Pokuttia–Bukovina dialect was formed under the influence of Romance languages. The dialect preserved several archaic endings and soft declension, and certain lexical peculiarities, including Romanianisms. The expansion of ancient Pokuttian phonetic features in the 14th-16th centuries in western Podolia contributed to the formation of a broader group of Dniester dialects.

Area of dialect's distribution 

The area of the Pokuttian-Bukovinian dialect covers the regions of western Ukraine located in the lower and middle reaches of the Dniester River (on the right bank of the Dniester east of the Carpathian Mountains). This area covers the eastern districts of the Ivano-Frankivsk region and almost entirely the territory of the Chernivtsi region, excluding its extreme western areas, generally coinciding with the historical and ethnographic regions of Pokuttia and Northern Bukovina. The dialect can also be found in small areas of Romania in the border areas with Ukraine (in the northern part of the Suceava County) and along the territory of Moldova.

Pokuttia–Bukovina dialect in Moldavia 
The Slavs of the Pruto-Dniester region, together with the Romanians, who appeared as a compact ethnic group in the middle of the 14th century, and the Ruthenians of Transylvania created the Moldavian principality. In the 14th century, they made up around 39.5% of the population of this principality. Almost all the voivodes of the initial period of Moldavian history - Dragos, Bogdan I, Bogdan II, Lacko, and others bore Slavic names. The number of Slavic population of the principality is evidenced by the Novgorod and Voskresenskaya chronicles, which list the cities of the late XIV - early XV centuries, including those located in the lands that were by this time part of the Moldavian principality.

Some Slavs assimilated with the Moldavians, but the other part, living in the north and northeast of the Moldavian principality, managed to preserve their Slavic identity and called themselves Ruthenians or Russians. In the early twentieth century, researchers emphasized the cultural and linguistic features of this ethnic group, and its difference from the Moldavians, Northern Russians, and Southern Russians.

Linguistics 

The study of the Pokuttia–Bukovina dialect was carried out by such researchers of Ukrainian dialects as I. G. Verhratsky, Y. .A. Karpenko, K. Kisilevsky, B. V. Kobylyansky, K. Lukyanyuk, V. A Prokopenko and others.

The vocabulary of the Pokutsk-Bukovinian dialect area is characterized by such words as: ґázda, gazdin'i (Ukrainian literary gentleman, lord "master, mistress"),  (Ukrainian literal  "serum"),  (Ukrainian letter piven "rooster"), lilik (Ukrainian letter  "bat"),  (Ukrainian letter hornless "hornless"),  (Ukrainian letter  "brushwood") etc. With the Hutsul dialects, the Pokutsko-Bukovinian ones combine the following words:  (Ukrainian literal potato "potato"),  (Ukrainian literal weather "weather") and many others.

See also
Ukrainians of Romania
Ukrainian dialects

References

Ukrainian dialects
Bukovina
Pokuttia